Franklin G. Wells (March 4, 1932 – April 3, 1994) was an American businessman who served as president of The Walt Disney Company from 1984 until his death in 1994.

Life and career
Wells was born in Coronado, California and traced his ancestry back to the Mayflower. He attended Pomona College, which he left as Phi Beta Kappa in 1953. Wells was a recipient of a Rhodes Scholarship, through which he obtained a BA at Oxford University. He went into the army for two years as an infantry first lieutenant and then graduated from Stanford Law School and became a lawyer.

Before his tenure with Disney, Wells had worked for Warner Bros. as its West Coast vice president in 1969, then in 1973 as president, and in 1977 as vice chairman until he left the company in 1982.

Disney directors Roy E. Disney, Stanley Gold and Sid Bass had ousted President and CEO Ron W. Miller in 1984. The Disney board then recruited Wells to become Disney's president and chief operating officer (1984–1994), along with Michael Eisner as chairman and CEO, and Jeffrey Katzenberg as head of Walt Disney Studios. Wells was unique among the management troika in that he had the highest academic achievement. Although the number-two executive at Disney, Wells reported to the board of directors and not to Eisner.

Seven Summits
Wells was an avid alpinist and came close to achieving his goal of climbing the Seven Summits, the highest mountains on each of the seven continents:
 Kilimanjaro in Africa
 Denali (Mount McKinley) in North America
 Aconcagua in South America
 Elbrus in Europe
 Mount Everest in Asia
 Mount Kosciuszko in Australia
 Vinson in Antarctica
Only Everest eluded him, as bad weather had forced his party to descend when just 3,000 feet from the summit. His partner in the Seven Summits attempt, Dick Bass, an entrepreneur who developed the Snowbird ski resort in Utah, later made it up all seven peaks, the first man to do so. At the Matterhorn Bobsleds attraction at Disneyland, Wells' love of mountain climbing is honored with exploration equipment emblazoned with the words "Wells Expedition," which can be seen during the ride's downhill descent, as well as on a window on Main Street USA honoring him.

Death

Wells died in a helicopter crash on Easter 1994 while returning from a heliskiing trip in Nevada's Ruby Mountains. Pilot Dave Walton and rock climber Beverly Johnson were also killed in the crash. He was a good friend of Clint Eastwood, who had been skiing with Wells that weekend. Eastwood left in his own helicopter just an hour before Wells' departure. Because of poor weather in the area, the chartered Bell 206 helicopter carrying Wells had landed at a remote location about two and a half hours prior to the crash. While waiting for improved weather conditions, snow fell on the helicopter. During the subsequent takeoff and ascent, the engine lost power and the aircraft crashed on a 30-degree slope, followed by a rollover, during an attempted emergency landing. The National Transportation Safety Board determined that the probable cause of the accident was "the ingestion of foreign material (snow) in the engine, which resulted in a flameout (loss of engine power)." Of the five persons on board, four were killed. The sole survivor was Mike Hoover.

Wells was buried at Forest Lawn - Hollywood Hills Cemetery. At the funeral, Eastwood sang a tribute of The Beatles' "Hey Jude", which Wells liked to sing on the slopes. The Lion King, which came out the summer after Wells' death, includes a dedication right before the Walt Disney Pictures logo appears (though the 2003 Platinum Edition, the 2011 Diamond Edition and the 2017 Signature Edition have the dedication at the end of the credits). The building housing the Walt Disney Archives at Walt Disney Studios was also named in Wells' honor.

References

Sources

External links

 

1932 births
1994 deaths
20th-century American businesspeople
People from Coronado, California
American Rhodes Scholars
Stanford Law School alumni
American film studio executives
Burials at Forest Lawn Memorial Park (Hollywood Hills)
California lawyers
Disney executives
Warner Bros. people
Accidental deaths in Nevada
Pomona College alumni
Alumni of the University of Oxford
Victims of aviation accidents or incidents in 1994
Victims of helicopter accidents or incidents in the United States